Horishnia Vyhnanka is a village located in Chortkiv Raion (district) of Ternopil Oblast (province of Western Ukraine). It belongs to Chortkiv urban hromada, one of the hromadas of Ukraine. The population of the village is 1202 people and covers an area of 16.53 km2

Local government is administered by Horishnovyhnanska village council. The village of Perekhody belongs to Horishnovyhnanska village council.

Geography 
The village is situated on the high left bank of the Seret River.

History 
The remains of settlements Tripoli culture discovered in the village (3rd millennium BC) but the first record of the village dates back to 1518.
From 11th century to 1144 the village was part of the Principality of Terebovlia, then the Principality of Galicia–Volhynia, and in 1387 came under the power of feudal Poland.

References

External links 
 village Horishnia Vyhnanka
 Місцеві ради → Горішня Вигнанка → Історична довідка 
 weather.in.ua

Villages in Chortkiv Raion